The Man Who Cried Wolf may refer to:

A variant of The Boy Who Cried Wolf, fable by Aesop
“The Man Who Cried Wolf”, by Robert Bloch
The Man Who Cried Wolf (film), 1937 film
'The Man Who Cried Wolf', season 3, episode 4 of the 1990 TV series Zorro
'The Man Who Cried Wolf', season 1, episode 3 of Don't Call Me Charlie!, 1962

See also
The Old Man Who Cried Wolf, 1970 TV film
The Man Who Cried, a 2000 Anglo-French drama film